The 1968–69 season was Manchester United's 67th season in the Football League, and their 24th consecutive season in the top division of English football. After the end of the season, on 4 June 1969, United manager Matt Busby stepped down as manager after 24 years as manager; he had announced his intention to retire on 14 January. He was replaced with Wilf McGuinness who only managed the team for a year and a half before Matt Busby returned as United manager for another six months.

George Best was United's top goalscorer in the league with 19 goals, although Denis Law added to his 14 league goals with a further 16 in the cups to reach a grand total of 30 goals in all competitions to top the club's goalscoring charts.

United finished 11th in the First Division this season, and were semi-finalists in the European Cup.

First Division

FA Cup

European Cup

Intercontinental Cup

Squad statistics

References

Manchester United F.C. seasons
Manchester United